An Ordinary Execution is a 2010 French drama film directed by Marc Dugain based on his 2007 novel.

Cast 
 Marina Hands - Anna
 André Dussollier - Joseph Stalin 
 Édouard Baer - Vassilli
 Denis Podalydès - le concierge
 Tom Novembre - le directeur de l'hôpital  
 Grégory Gadebois - le chef de service à l'hôpital  
 Gilles Gaston-Dreyfus - Beria 
 Anne Benoît - Alexandra

References

External links 

2010 drama films
French drama films